João Victor da Silva Marcelino (born 17 July 1998), known as João Victor, is a Brazilian professional footballer who plays as a central defender for Ligue 1 club Nantes on loan from Primeira Liga club Benfica.

Club career

Corinthians
Born in Bauru, São Paulo, João Victor joined Corinthians' youth setup for the 2017 season, on loan from Coimbra. The club subsequently bought 55% of his economic rights, with the player signing a permanent contract until July 2021.

In November 2019, after making his senior debut with the B-team in the Copa Paulista, João Victor was loaned to Inter de Limeira for the 2020 Campeonato Paulista. He immediately became a starter at the side, and subsequently joined Série A side Atlético Goianiense on 29 June 2020, also in a temporary deal.

João Victor made his top tier debut on 30 August 2020, coming on as a late substitute for Dudu in a 2–0 home loss against Ceará.

Benfica
On 8 July 2022, Victor signed a five-year contract with Portuguese club Benfica for a fee of €8.5 million for 80% of his economic rights. After being sidelined with a ankle injury for three months, he made his debut for the club on 15 October, replacing António Silva in the 91st minute in the 1–1 draw to Liga 3 side Caldas in the third round of the Taça de Portugal, after extra-time, which Benfica went on to win 6–4 in a penalty shoot-out.

After making three appearances during Benfica's opening half of the season, on 25 January 2023, Victor joined French Ligue 1 club Nantes on loan until the rest of the season.

Career statistics

References

External links

1998 births
Living people
People from Bauru
Brazilian footballers
Association football defenders
Campeonato Brasileiro Série A players
Ligue 1 players
Sport Club Corinthians Paulista players
Associação Atlética Internacional (Limeira) players
Atlético Clube Goianiense players
S.L. Benfica footballers
FC Nantes players
Brazilian expatriate footballers
Expatriate footballers in France
Footballers from São Paulo (state)